Horn Again is the seventeenth studio album by Japanese alternative rock band The Pillows. It was released on January 26, 2011.

Track listing 

The Pillows albums
2009 albums